Jan Evert Veer (born 1 November 1950 in The Hague) is a former water polo player from the Netherlands. He participated in three Summer Olympics, starting in 1972 in Munich. After the seventh place in West Germany, four years later the Dutch won the bronze medal at the 1976 Summer Olympics in Montreal. In 1980 Veer finished in sixth position with the Holland squad.

Veer has been coaching TW Zaanstreek after his playing career.

See also
 List of Olympic medalists in water polo (men)

References

External links
 

1950 births
Living people
Dutch male water polo players
Dutch water polo coaches
Olympic bronze medalists for the Netherlands in water polo
Water polo players at the 1972 Summer Olympics
Water polo players at the 1976 Summer Olympics
Water polo players at the 1980 Summer Olympics
Sportspeople from The Hague
Medalists at the 1976 Summer Olympics
20th-century Dutch people